Ovidiu Forai (15 June 1919 – 26 July 1979) was a Romanian wrestler. He competed in the men's Greco-Roman light heavyweight at the 1952 Summer Olympics.

References

1919 births
1979 deaths
Romanian male sport wrestlers
Olympic wrestlers of Romania
Wrestlers at the 1952 Summer Olympics
Sportspeople from Craiova